Emmanuel Roberto Goffi (born December 10, 1971) is a French philosopher of technologies and, more specifically, an artificial intelligence ethicist. He has served in the French Air Force for 27 years. He is the co-founder and co-director of the Global AI Ethics Institute in Paris. He is also  an instructor and research associate with the Frankfurt Big Data Lab at the Goethe University Frankfurt in Germany and a research fellow with the Centre for Defence and Security Studies at the University of Manitoba, Winnipeg, Manitoba in Canada. After having worked on military ethics, and more precisely on ethics applied to Lethal autonomous weapon, his focus has turned to ethics applied to Artificial intelligence.

Emmanuel Goffi lectured in international relations and the Law of Armed Conflict at the École de l'air (French Air Force Academy) for five years before he was appointed as a research associate at the Center for Aerospace Strategic Studies in Paris. Goffi also taught international relations at the DSI Diplomatic Studies Institute in Marseille, at the Management Institute of Paris and at the École supérieure de commerce et management (ESCEM) in Paris. He is the author of Les armées françaises face à la morale: une réflexion au cœur des conflits modernes (Paris: , 2011).http://www.bigdata.uni-frankfurt.de/ethical-implications-ai-ss2020/

Emmanuel Goffi graduated from the French Air Force Military Academy and holds a master's degree in political science from the Paris Institute of Political Science (Sciences Po) and a research master's degree in political science from the Aix Institute of Political Science. He holds a PhD (highest honor) in political science from the Institut d'études politiques de Paris-Centre de recherches internationales (Sciences Po-CERI).

Military career
Emmanuel Goffi joined the French Air Force in 1992 as a non-commissioned officer and specialist in electrotechnics.

After a competitive exam, he was admitted to join the École militaire de l'air in Salon de Provence in 2000.

After he left the French Air Force Academy, Emmanuel Goffi was appointed Deputy Chief of the Air Force Headquarters Network Management Cell, at the Centre de gestion de l’armée de l’Air in Paris, France, in September 2001.

He was then moved to the Personal staff of the Chief of Staff of the French Air Force as a speech-writer and linguist in September 2002.
 
In 2003, he is posted at the Délégation à l'information et à la communication de la Défense to be an analyst in International Relations.

In 2007, after he completed his master's degree at Sciences Po and finished his scholarship at the University of Queensland in Australia, he is posted as a professor of international relations at the French Air Force Academy. He will then be Deputy Head and later Head, of the Department of Human Sciences. During his tenure, he also teaches the Law of Armed Conflict, Ethics and Communication. 
While at the French Air Force Academy, he notably set up the Law of Armed Conflict Module in the framework of the Initiative européenne pour les échanges de jeunes officiers, inspirée d'Erasmus (European initiative for the exchange of young officers inspired by Erasmus), that was finally adopted as the model for all European military academies by the Collège européen de sécurité et de défense (European College for Security and Defence) in Brussels. Emmanuel was also the first professor to give a course in English (a part of English language courses) at the French Air Force Academy. Besides, this module gave birth to an annual international seminar and an edited book issued in 2011.

From September 2012 to September 2014, is appointed Strategy Analyst, Influence Officer and Research Associate at Centre d’Etudes Stratégiques Aérospatiales (CESA), where he works on drones, ethics and security studies. While at the CESA he notably co-edited a seminal volume of more than 40 contributions about drones, Les drones aériens: passé, présent et avenir. Approche globale, published in 2013.

In 2014, he is granted an extended leave to start a new career in Canada, and retired in July 2019 after 25 years of service.

Research activities
After two years in Science Po, during which he spent one semester at the University of Queensland in Brisbane, QLD, Australia, he started working on international relations, focusing on military ethics. He then directed his research activities on ethical issues related to the use of drones and military robots in modern conflicts, and its impact upon the profession of arms.

Through moral philosophy, he tries to offer new approaches for military ethics, basing his reflections upon intersubjectivity, moral responsibility, and moral freedom.

Emmanuel's doctoral dissertation, entitled "Le sacrifice suprême, une approche critique de la construction d'un mythe: les officiers français et la mort pro patria dans le contexte du conflit en Afghanistan" (Supreme Sacrifice: A Critical Approach of the Construction of a Myth. The French Officers and Death Pro Patria in the Context of the Afghan Conflict), addresses the issue of supreme-sacrifice in modern conflicts trying to show that the obligation to consent to sacrifice is a social construct which needs to be questioned in regard to modern military engagements.

Emmanuel Goffi is also a research fellow at the Centre for Defence and Security Studies, University of Manitoba (Canada) and a research associate with Sciences Po-Centre de recherches internationales. He is currently conducting researches as a research associate with the Canadian Mennonite University in Winnipeg on the evolution of peace operations in Africa.

Teaching activities

Goffi mainly taught international relations focusing on threats to international security, such as terrorism, environmental or technology issues, but also on French foreign policy and international relations theories. He also teaches strategy.

While posted at the French Air Force Academy, he also provided courses on the law of armed conflicts and international relations ethics. He extensively worked on the organization of the international seminar on the law of armed conflicts (LOAC) yearly held at the French Air Force Academy, and on the building of the French Air Force Academy's LOAC module and its integration to the "European initiative for the exchange of young officers inspired by Erasmus" training program.

Courses taught
Institut libre d'étude des relations internationales, Paris, France
 Éthique et relations internationales

Brandon University, Brandon, Manitoba, Canada
 78.381 International Organizations

University of Manitoba, Winnipeg, Manitoba, Canada
 POLS 7850 Contemporary Strategic and Security Studies;
 POLS 4730 Strategic Studies
 POLS 3200 International Security and Conflict Management
 POLS 2040 Introduction to International Relations
 POLS 1040 Global Political Issues (International College of Manitoba)

École de l'air, Salon-de-provence, France
 Introduction aux relations internationales
 Droit des conflits armés
 Éthique et relations internationales

École supérieure de commerce et de management, Paris, France
 Introduction aux relations internationales

Management Institute of Paris, Paris, France
 Strategy in international contexts

ISD – Institut des sciences diplomatiques de Marseille, Marseille, France
 Participation des organisations internationales aux relations internationales
 Évaluation de la participation des acteurs non-étatiques
 Théorie générale des relations internationales
 Espaces régionaux et leurs rapports internes et externes

Works

Monograph
 Les armées françaises face à la morale. Une réflexion au cœur des conflits modernes, Paris: L'Harmattan, coll. Histoire de la Défense, 2011, 216 p.

Edited volumes
 Sébastien MAZOYER, Jérôme LESPINOIS, Emmanuel GOFFI, Grégory BOUTHERIN, Christophe PAJON (coord.). Les drones aériens: passé, présent et avenir. Approche globale. Paris: La Documentation française, coll. Stratégie aérospatiale, 2013. 708 p.
 Grégory BOUTHERIN, Emmanuel GOFFI (dir.). L'Europe et sa défense. Paris: Choiseul, 2011. 280 p.
 Emmanuel GOFFI, Grégory BOUTHERIN (dir.). Les conflits et le droit. Paris: Choiseul, 2011. 200 p.

Selected articles and books chapters

  Les carnets du temps, No. 108, septembre 2014. p. 22-23..
 Combattre à distance: le courage au centre du débat éthique. Revue Défense Nationale, No. 771, Juin 2014. p. 109-112.
 The Ibar Bridge Attack: A Moral Assessment. Journal of Military Ethics, Vol. 12, No. 4, January 2014. p. 380-382.
 There is No Real Obligation to Obey Orders: Escaping from 'Low Cost Deontology'. In Andrea Ellner, Paul Robinson, David Whetham (Eds). When Soldiers Say No: Selective Conscientious Objection in the Modern Military. Aldershot, England: Ashgate, 2013. p. 43-68.
  Penser les ailes françaises, No. 29, December 2013. p. 28-37.
  Dynamiques internationales, 'Robots on the Battlefield: What does it mean for international relations?', No. 8, June 2013. 
  In Sébastien MAZOYER, Jérôme LESPINOIS, Emmanuel GOFFI, Grégory BOUTHERIN, Christophe PAJON (coord.). Les drones aériens: passé, présent et avenir. Approche globale. Paris: La Documentation française, coll. Stratégie aérospatiale, 2013. p. 349-368.
  In Paolo TRIPODI, Carroll J. CONNELLEY (eds.). Aspects of Leadership: Ethics, Law and Spirituality. Quantico VA: Marine Corps University Press, 2012. p. 87-110.
  CRUSER News, issue 14, April 2012. 
  In Grégory BOUTHERIN, Camille GRAND (dir.). Envol vers 2025. Réflexions prospectives sur la puissance aérospatiale. Paris: Documentation française, coll. Stratégie aérospatiale, 2011. p. 103-116.
 Emmanuel GOFFI, Grégory BOUTHERIN. Le droit des conflits armés à l'épreuve de la technologie. Défense & Sécurité Internationale, No 72, juillet-août 2011. p. 34-38.
 Expression libre. Inflexions. Civils et militaires : pouvoir dire, No. 22, 'Courage !' janvier2013. p. 119-127. 
 Grégory BOUTHERIN, Emmanuel GOFFI. Les UAVs armés sous le feu des débats. Revue Défence Nationale, No. 735, décembre 2010. p. 114-120.

Selected talks

 The Futility of the So-Called 'War on Terrorism. 18th Annual Graduate Strategic Studies Conference 'Strategy, Security, and Defence'. University of Calgary, Centre for Military, Security and Strategic Studies, Calgary AB, Canada, February 25, 2016.
 A French Perspective on Military Ethics. Unit Ethics Coordinator course. Canadian Forces Base, Winnipeg MB, Canada, February 6, 2016.
 Military drones: Who will be responsible for what?. Manitoba chapter of the Canadian Aviation Historical Society's Speaker Event 'Drone Technology'. Royal Aviation Museum of Western Canada, Winnipeg MB, Canada, April 30, 2015.
 Moralité et drones armés: pour en finir avec une vision dépassée de la guerre. 6e Rencontre internationale Université-Défense 'Les drones: un outil incontournable, des questions légitimes'. Institut militaire de Québec/Université Laval, Québec QC, Canada, March 25, 2015.
  Le débat éthique sur l'emploi des drones armés et ses limites (lit. The ethical debate on the use of drones and its limits), Fondation pour la recherche stratégique, Maison de la Chimie, Paris, France, June 30, 2014.
 Round table L'Homme face à l'interconnexion des systèmes. 8e Rencontre Aviation Civile Aviation Militaire 'L'Homme et l'aéronautique: Regards croisés vers le futur', Direction générale de l'aviation civile, Paris, France, June 4, 2014.
 Drones, Robotics, Combat and the Ethics of Military Courage, University of Manitoba, Winnipeg MB, Canada. February 5, 2014.
  Quelle place pour l'éthique dans la guerre des drones? (lit. What place for ethics in drone warfare?), at ANAJ-IHEDN, France, January 2014
 The Legitimacy of Warfare Fought by Robots: The Raise of A-Courageous Warriors, Autonomous, Unmanned Systems & Robotics Conference, Yes Planet Hall, Rishon LeZion, Israel. November 26–28, 2013.
 Re-Thinking Courage in Light of Military Technology Improvement, International Society for Military Ethics, 2013 Conference Military Virtues and Contemporary Challenges, University of Notre Dame, South Bend, IN, United States of America. October 13–16, 2013.
 Lethal Autonomous Robotics and the Right to Life: Expert Consultation with the UN Special Rapporteur on extrajudicial, summary or arbitrary executions, Christof Heyns, European University Institute, Florence, Italy. February 23, 2013.
 Challenging Self-sacrifice – Is Technology the Executioner of Warrior's Honor? 17th International Conference of the Society for Philosophy and Technology, University of North Texas, Denton, TX, USA. May 26–29, 2011. 
 Ethics and Technology in Modern Warfare: a Matter of Responsibility. International Society for Military Ethics, 2011 Symposium The Ethics of Emerging Military Technologies, University of San Diego, San Diego, CA, United States of America. January 25–28, 2011.
 The Impact of Technology on Self Sacrifice in Modern Conflicts – Are Soldiers Still Ready to Die? Postgraduate Conference, King's College/Department of War Studies, Cumberland Lodge, Berkshire, UK. October 6–8, 2010.
 The False Debate over the Morality of Robots on the Battlefield – Rediscovering the Principle of Responsibility. Expert Workshop on Arms Control for Robots – International Committee for Robots Arms Control, Humboldt-Universität, Berlin, Germany. September 20–22, 2010.

References

External links
  Emmanuel Goffi on the ILERI website.
  Emmanuel Goffi's testimony. The Conversation, 16 septembre 2019. Une vie avant la recherche : un militaire face à l’éthique (lit. A life before research: a military man facing ethics). 
 Sciences Po-CERI Emmanuel Goffi's personal webpage.
 Centre for Defence and Security Studies Emmanuel Goffi's personal webpage.
 Interview with Satgin Hamrah. E-International Relations, February 21, 2016. The impact drones on modern warfare, the centrality of the constructivist perspective, and the myth of ‘supreme sacrifice.
  Interview with Arnaud Decroix, ICI Radio-Canada, Les samedis du monde, November 21, 2015, 9:13am En quoi consiste la guerre contre le terrorisme ?.
  Interview with Martine Bordeleau. ICI Radio-Canada, 'Le 6 à 9', April 27, 2015, 8:18am.  Conférence sur l'utilisation des drones. (lit. Conference on the use of drones).
  Interview with Catherine Lachaussée. ICI Radio-Canada, 'Radio-Canada cet après-midi', March 25, 2015, 3:37pm.  Conférence sur les drones à l'Université Laval. (lit. Conference on drones at the Université Laval).
  Interview with Karine Morin. ICI Radio-Canada, 'Les samedis du monde', February 21, 2015, 10:12am.  Les drones militaires changent la guerre. (lit. Drones are transforming war). 
 Interview with Charles Adler, CJOB, 'The Charles Adler Show', February 3, 2015, 9:30am.
  Interview with Kim Roy-Grenier. ICI Radio-Canada, 'L'Actuel', January 30, 2015, 5:45pm.  Les drones et le futur de la guerre. (lit. Drones and the future of warfare).
 Drones and the future of war. Interview with Terry McLeod. CBC, 'Weekend Morning Show', January 25, 2015, 7am.  
  France Culture, 'Culturesmonde', June 18, 2014, 11am.  Du mercenaire au hacker, les figures du guerrier moderne (3/4) - Robots, drones: le défi éthique de la guerre à distance. (lit. From the mercenary to the hacker, the figures of modern warriors (3/4) - Robots, drones: Challenges of warfare at a distance). 
  Radio France internationale, 'Le débat du jour', April 28, 2014. Torture: peut-on transiger avec le droit pour obtenir du renseignement? (lit. Torture: can we compromise with the law to obtain information?)
 Agence France-Presse. Chemical weapons taboo since WWI horror deaths. Globalpost, August 28, 2013.
  Pierre Martinez, Frédéric Coste, Adeline Taravella. . IRSEM, EPS 2011-27, rapport final, 23 janvier 2012. (lit. Man-Robot Relationship, Taking into account the new sociological factors. Contains multiple references to Goffi's books.)
 Caroline Kennedy, Nicholas Rengger. The New Assassination Bureau: On the 'Robotic Turn' in Contemporary War. Carnegie Council for Ethics in International Affairs'', November 6, 2012.

1971 births
21st-century French philosophers
French ethicists
French Air and Space Force personnel
French international relations scholars
Canadian international relations scholars
Living people
French male non-fiction writers